The National Centre of Social Republicans (Centre national des républicains sociaux, CNRS), or Social Republicans (Républicains sociaux, RS), was a French Gaullist political party founded in 1954. The party succeeded the Rally of the French People, but was not backed by Charles De Gaulle. The party did poorly in the 1956 parliamentary elections (relative to the RFP's performance in the 1951 elections).

Its president was Jacques Chaban-Delmas. It ceased to exist in 1958.

References

See also 
 Rally of the French People
 Union for the New Republic

Charles de Gaulle
French Fourth Republic
 
Political parties established in 1954
Political parties disestablished in 1958
Defunct political parties in France
1958 disestablishments in France
1954 establishments in France